Adedayo Agarau is Nigerian poet, essayist and art administrator. Agarau is a member of the UnSerious Collective. He is the editor-in-chief of Agbowo, an African literary magazine. He was a founding editor at IceFloe Press, Canada as the New International Voices editor and African Chapbook Acquisition manager. Agarau curated and edited Memento: An Anthology of Contemporary Nigerian Poetry.

Work 
Agarau is the author of three poetry chapbooks: For Boys Who Went, 2016, The Origin of Name which was selected for a chapbook box edited by Kwame Dawes and Chris Abani in 2020, and The Arrival of Rain, published in 2020 by Vegetarian Alcoholic Press. His writing is leading conversations on the possibilities of a wave of the new generation Nigerian writers and have attracted wide review from magazines like Open Country, YesPoetry, and AfroCritik.  

Agarau's poems have been featured in online and print literary journals including Poetry Magazine, World Literature Today, Iowa Review, Poet Lore, Poetry Society of America, Frontier Poetry, Lolwe, Olongo Africa, Anmly, TheShore Poetry, Giallo Lit. His essay has been published in Isele Magazine, Trampset, Icefloe Press and YesPoetry. He has been profiled or interviewed on international platforms including Africritik, Africa in Dialogue, Literature Voices, Nanty Greens, Libretto, Poets in Nigeria, Isele Magazine, Splash FM, Shamsrumi. Agarau was shortlisted for the Brunel African Poetry Prize in 2022, receipient of the Stanley Award for International Research and the Robert Hayden Fellowship. Agarau curated Memento: An Anthology of Contemporary Nigerian Poetry and the Nigerian National Poetry Prize.

 Bibliography 
 For Boys Who Went, Words Rhymes & Rhythm, 2016
 So Righteous We Go Flying, Elisabeth Horan, 2019
 Memento: An Anthology of Contemporary Nigerian Poetry (ed.)
 The Arrival Of Rain, Vegetarian Alcoholic Press, 2020
 The Origin Of Name'',

Awards and nominations 

 Finalist, Sillerman First Book Poetry Prize 2021
 Frontier Poetry: THE 2020 INDUSTRY PRIZE, 3RD PLACE WINNER: BAD DREAM WITH MY GRANDMOTHER’S STROKE BY ADEDAYO AGARAU
 Longlist, The Emerging Poet Prize 2020: Palette Poetry
 SEVHAGE/Angya Poetry Prize 2019 - Adedayo Agarau ‘the origin of a name’ [1st Runner Up]
 Shortlist, Babishai Niwe Poetry Prize 2018
 Eriata Oribhabor Poetry Prize (EOPP) 2017

References 

Nigerian poets
Nigerian editors

Year of birth missing (living people)
Living people